Cashmere Mafia is an American comedy-drama television series which ran on ABC from January 6, 2008 to February 20, 2008. The series was created by Kevin Wade, who also served as executive producer alongside Darren Star, Gail Katz, Jeff Rake and Michael Pressman, with Susie Fitzgerald co-executive producing. Peyton Reed directed the pilot.

ABC decided not to renew the series for a second season.

Details 
Cashmere Mafia follows the lives of four ambitious women, longtime best friends since their days at business school, as they try to balance their glamorous and demanding careers with their complex personal lives by creating their own "boys' club" (The Cashmere Mafia) to protect one another and discuss their personal ups and downs as they try to have it all in New York City.

Cast

Principal characters 
 Lucy Liu: Mia Mason – Publisher at Barnstead Media Group
 Frances O'Connor: Zoe Burden – Former Managing Director of Mergers and Acquisitions at Gorham Sutter
 Miranda Otto: Juliet Draper – COO of Stanton Hall Hotels and Resorts
 Bonnie Somerville: Caitlin Dowd – Senior V.P. for Marketing at Lily Parrish Cosmetics
 Peter Hermann: Davis Draper – Manager of a hedge fund, ex-husband of Juliet
 Julian Ovenden: Eric Burden – Architect, husband of Zoe

Recurring characters 
 Noelle Beck: Cilla Grey – Frienemy of the Cashmere Mafia, had affair with Davis, referred to as "The $100 Million Woman"
 Lourdes Benedicto: Alicia Lawson – Advertising agency rep. Formerly dated Caitlin and is pregnant
 Tom Everett Scott: Jack Cutting – Ex-fiancé and former co-worker of Mia
 Peyton List: Sasha Burden – Zoe's daughter
 Nicholas Art: Luke Burden – Zoe's son
 Addison Timlin: Emily Draper – Juliet's teenage daughter
 Jack J. Yang: Jason Chun – Brain surgeon, formerly dated Mia
 Daniel Gerroll: Clive Hughes – Mia's stern and demanding superior at Barnstead Media Group

Episodes

DVD releases
On September 23, 2008, Sony Pictures Home Entertainment released the complete series on DVD in Region 1.  This release has been discontinued and is out of print.

On August 2, 2016, Mill Creek Entertainment will re-release the complete series on DVD in Region 1.

Production and airing 
Produced by Sony Pictures Television, Darren Star Productions and Gail Katz Productions, the series was officially greenlit and given a thirteen-episode order on May 11, 2007. The series was initially scheduled to air as a mid-season replacement, with plans for a debut on November 27, 2007 on ABC as an off-season replacement for the Dancing with the Stars results show. However, due to the 2007–2008 Writers Guild of America strike, only 7 of the 13 episodes ordered were produced. ABC also delayed the premiere of the series due to future concerns about programming and promotions. Cashmere Mafia had a special preview on Sunday, January 6, 2008 and then moved to its regular time slot on Wednesday, January 9 at 10:00PM Eastern/9:00PM Central following Supernanny as a mid-season replacement for Dirty Sexy Money. It competed indirectly with NBC's Lipstick Jungle, created by Star's former creative partner from Sex and the City, Candace Bushnell.

It has also been purchased by Polsat in Poland, NTV7 in Malaysia, MediaCorp TV Channel 5 in Singapore, RTÉ Two in Ireland, RTL 5 in the Netherlands, on KanaalTwee in Belgium, Nova TV in Croatia, TVI in Portugal,  TV2 in New Zealand, Nine Network in Australia, E!  in Canada, Nelonen in Finland, on AXN in India, on RTV Pink in Serbia, TV3 in Denmark, on Multivisión in Cuba, on Téva and M6 in France, on Domashniy in Russia and also in Italy by Mediaset.

U.S. Nielsen ratings

References

External links 
 

2008 American television series debuts
2008 American television series endings
2000s American comedy-drama television series
2000s American LGBT-related comedy television series
2000s American LGBT-related drama television series
English-language television shows
Lesbian-related television shows
Television shows set in New York City
Television series by Sony Pictures Television
Television shows directed by Peyton Reed
American Broadcasting Company original programming